Archie Garfield Worthing was president of the Optical Society of America from 1941–42.

See also
Optical Society of America#Past Presidents of the OSA

References

External links
 Articles Published by early OSA Presidents  Journal of the Optical Society of America

1881 births
1949 deaths
Presidents of Optica (society)
20th-century American physicists